Uji Dainagon Monogatari is a collection of stories by Minamoto no Takakuni

Uji Dainagon Monogatari may also refer to the following story or stories:
Konjaku Monogatarishū
Uji Shūi Monogatari